Thaha is an Indian film director and writer, known primarily for his slapstick comedy movies.

Career 
Earlier Thaha worked as an assistant director in films including Rajavinte Makan, Bhoomiyile Rajakkanmar, Kakkothikkavile Appooppan Thaadikal, and Varnam to directors such as Kamal and Thampi Kannanthanam. In 1991, he co-directed with Ashokan the film Mookkillarajyathu, as Ashokan-Thaha. Later he went on to direct films independently.

Filmography

As assistant director

As director

References

External links 
 

Malayalam film directors
Malayalam screenwriters
20th-century Indian film directors
21st-century Indian film directors